Strathcarron may refer to:

Baron Strathcarron
Strathcarron railway station
Strathcarron Sports Cars
Strathcarron, Highland, a village in Scotland
the strath of the River Carron, Wester Ross
the strath of the River Carron (Forth)
the strath of the River Carron, Sutherland